Opera continued to be one of the main features of the Edinburgh International Festival in the second decade.

The tradition of inviting one or more guest companies each year to bring productions to the festival continued with La Scala (Piccola Scala), the Stuttgart State Opera, Royal Opera Stockholm, Glyndebourne Opera, Covent Garden Opera, Belgrade Opera, the English Opera Group, Teatro San Carlo, Naples, Budapest Opera and Ballet, National Theatre, Prague, the Holland Festival and the Bavarian State Opera.

Distinguished conductors included the large Italian contingent of Antonino Votto, Nino Sanzogno, Gianandrea Gavazzeni, Vittorio Gui, Carlo Maria Giulini, Alberto Erede and Oliviero De Fabritiis, the Hungarians Georg Solti and János Ferencsik, the British John Pritchard and Benjamin Britten, as well as the German Ferdinand Leitner, the Austrian Carlos Kleiber, and the Croatian Lovro von Matačić. 

Major opera directors included Luchino Visconti, Giorgio Strehler, Franco Zeffirelli, Wieland Wagner, Günther Rennert and Carl Ebert. 

Star female singers included Maria Callas, Joan Sutherland, Magda Olivero, Renata Scotto, Fiorenza Cossotto, Inge Borkh, Irmgard Seefried, Victoria de los Ángeles, Birgit Nilsson, Anja Silja, Kerstin Meyer, and Elisabeth Söderström, while male singers included Luigi Alva, Giuseppe Di Stefano, Nicolai Gedda, Alfredo Kraus, Fritz Wunderlich, Wolfgang Windgassen, Peter Pears, Fernando Corena, Sesto Bruscantini, Geraint Evans and Boris Christoff.

1957 (four productions)

1958 (five productions)

1959 (five productions)

1960 (three productions)

1961 (four productions)

1962 (six productions)

1963 (six productions)

1964 (five productions)

1965 (five productions)

1966 (four productions)

See also
Opera at the Edinburgh International Festival: history and repertoire, 1947–1956
Opera at the Edinburgh International Festival: history and repertoire, 1967–1976
Drama at the Edinburgh International Festival: history and repertoire, 1947–1956
Drama at the Edinburgh International Festival: history and repertoire, 1957–1966
Ballet at the Edinburgh International Festival: history and repertoire, 1947–1956
Ballet at the Edinburgh International Festival: history and repertoire, 1957–1966
Ballet at the Edinburgh International Festival: history and repertoire, 1967–1976
Musicians at the Edinburgh International Festival, 1947 to 1956
Musicians at the Edinburgh International Festival, 1957–1966
Visual Arts at the Edinburgh International Festival, 1947–1976
World premieres at the Edinburgh International Festival
Edinburgh Festival Fringe
List of Edinburgh festivals
List of opera festivals

References

Edinburgh Festival
Classical music festivals in Scotland
Opera festivals
Opera in Scotland
Annual events in Edinburgh
Opera-related lists
1957 music festivals
1958 music festivals
1959 music festivals
1960 music festivals
1961 music festivals
1962 music festivals
1963 music festivals
1964 music festivals
1965 music festivals
1966 music festivals